Sons and Lovers is a 1913 D. H. Lawrence novel. It may also refer to three film and television adaptations of the novel:

 Sons and Lovers (film), a 1960 film directed by Jack Cardiff
Sons and Lovers (album), a 1980 album by Hazel O'Connor
 Sons and Lovers (1981 TV serial), a BBC serial directed by Stuart Burge
 Sons and Lovers (2003 TV serial), a British serial directed by Stephen Whittaker